Kahina Bounab (born 24 January 1982) is an Algerian international volleyball player who plays for AC Tizi-Ouzou.

References

1982 births
Living people
Algerian women's volleyball players
Place of birth missing (living people)
21st-century Algerian women